Maria Canals-Barrera (born September 28, 1966) is an American actress. She is known for starring as Theresa Russo in the Disney Channel series Wizards of Waverly Place (2007–2012), Connie Torres in Camp Rock (2008) and Camp Rock 2: The Final Jam (2010), and Daniela in the ABC comedy series Cristela (2014–2015). 

Canals-Barrera has voiced Shayera Hol/Hawkgirl in a lead role in Justice League (2001–2004) and Justice League Unlimited (2004–2006) and in a guest appearance in Static Shock as part of the DC Animated Universe, Sunset Boulevardez in The Proud Family (2001–2005) and Paulina in Danny Phantom (2004–2007).

Early life
Canals-Barrera was born and raised in Miami, Florida, to Cuban parents of Catalan descent. Canals-Barrera also speaks Spanish and took drama classes in junior high school.

Canals-Barrera graduated from Hialeah-Miami Lakes Senior High School before winning a theatrical scholarship to the University of Miami.

Career

In her early years, Canals-Barrera worked extensively in theater in both Miami and Los Angeles. In 1990, she starred as Amanda in a production of The Glass Menagerie. In 1992, she starred in a production of Brian Michael Riley's A Cradle of Sparrows. The same year, she began starring on Telemundo Spanish-language telenovela Marielena. She later had the recurring role in the short-lived 1993 Fox comedy-drama series, Key West. During the 1990s, Canals-Barrera also guest starred in a number of television series, such as 21 Jump Street, Murder, She Wrote, Almost Perfect, and Caroline in the City. In 1996, she starred as the title character in a production of Hedda Gabler. The next year she played Digna in a production of Guillermo Reyes' Chilean Holiday. 

Her first regular role was on the short-lived NBC sitcom The Tony Danza Show in 1997. In early 2000s, Canals-Barrera had supporting roles in films America's Sweethearts, The Master of Disguise and Imagining Argentina. She has gained much recognition with comic book fans in recent years for her role as Hawkgirl/Shayera Hol on Bruce Timm's Justice League animated series (2001–04) and Justice League Unlimited (2005–06). She also had a recurring role in Static Shock as news reporter Shelly Sandoval, and in Danny Phantom as Paulina, the title character's high school crush. She also performed the voice of Mercedes "Meche" Colomar in the 1998 video game Grim Fandango. Canals-Barrera also played incidental characters in two episodes on the TV series The Boondocks ("Grandad's Fight" and "Home Alone").

From 2007 to 2012, Canals-Barrera co-starred as Theresa Russo, the mother of lead character Alex Russo (played by Selena Gomez), in the Disney Channel family sitcom Wizards of Waverly Place. She also co-starred in Wizards of Waverly Place: The Movie, a 2009 Disney Channel Original movie based on series. Canals-Barrera also appeared in the  Disney Channel Original Movies Camp Rock (2008) and Camp Rock 2: The Final Jam (2010) as Connie Torres, the mother of Demi Lovato's character. In 2011, she appeared opposite Tom Hanks and Julia Roberts in the romantic comedy film Larry Crowne.

In 2014, Canals-Barrera was cast as Hilda, the house manager of the country club where most of the action takes place, in the ABC soapy comedy-drama series Members Only created by Susannah Grant. However, it got cancelled by the network before its premiere. Later in that year she joined the cast of ABC comedy series Cristela, as Cristela Alonzo's character sister.

On August 27, 2018, it was revealed by TVLine that Canals-Barrera was cast as the mother of Fernando Hernandez-Guerrero-Fernandez-Guerrero on the Netflix series Fuller House.

Personal life
Barrera has been married to actor David Barrera since 1999, with whom she has two daughters.

Filmography

Film

Television

Video games

Awards and nominations

References

External links

 
 
 

1966 births
Living people
20th-century American actresses
21st-century American actresses
Actresses from Miami
American entertainers of Cuban descent
American film actresses
American people of Catalan descent
American television actresses
American video game actresses
American voice actresses
Hispanic and Latino American actresses